Hope For The Warriors is a national nonprofit organization in the United States that provides assistance to combat wounded service members, their families, and families of those killed in action. The organization focuses on those involved in Operation Iraqi Freedom and Operation Enduring Freedom and their families. Hope For The Warriors recently received a Four-Star Rating from Charity Navigator and was highlighted by George W. Bush in the Warrior Open.

About

Hope For The Warriors was co-founded in 2006 by Robin Kelly and Shannon Maxwell. They decided to found an advocacy group after Maxwell's husband, Tim Maxwell, was wounded in Iraq and suffered a traumatic brain injury (TBI). Hope For The Warriors provides aid to veterans in multiple forms, including building or refurbishing homes and providing professional development. It raises awareness of returning veterans by hosting Run For The Warriors in different areas of the United States, and by hosting athletes in Team Hope For The Warriors, who run or handcycle in the Marine Corps Marathon and the New York City Marathon or compete in triathlons, in order to raise money for the non-profit organization. Hope For The Warriors was a charity partner for both the 2011 Marine Corps Marathon and the 2011 New York City Marathon.

Hope For The Warriors was mentioned on Salon.com in an article called "How to give back this Thanksgiving". The article cites Hope For The Warriors as a worthy military charity to donate to based on its Charity Navigator rating.

Notable Board Members
The Hope For The Warriors website lists all of the nonprofit's board of directors. Some of its most notable board members include Jack Marin, Capt. Dan Moran, General Charles Krulak, General Richard Cody, Charlie Summers, and Gary Sinise.

References

United States military support organizations
Organizations established in 2006
Charities based in Virginia